Dum spiro spero, which translates to "While I breathe, I hope", is a Latin phrase of indeterminate origin. It is the motto of various places and organisations, including the U.S. state of South Carolina.

Derivation
The sense of dum spiro spero can be found in the work of Greek poet Theocritus (3rd Century BC), who wrote: "While there's life there's hope, and only the dead have none." That sentiment seems to have become common by the time of Roman statesman Cicero (106 – 43 BC), who wrote Atticus: "As in the case of a sick man one says, 'While there is life there is hope' [dum anima est, spes esse], so, as long as Pompey was in Italy, I did not cease to hope."

The phrase had begun appearing in its current form by at least the 1780s, as it is present on a representation of the seal of South Carolina printed in March 1785. At some point, it also became the motto of the town of St Andrews, Scotland, and is visible on heraldry around the town of from the mid-19th century onwards.

Usage

As a motto
Cothill House Preparatory School in Oxfordshire, England.
The Czech Army's 601st Special Forces Group, based in Prostějov
dispuut STROPDAS, part of Eindhovensche Studenten Roeivereniging Thêta (Student Rowing Club in Eindhoven, Netherlands)
Fairfield College, a secondary school in Hamilton, New Zealand
Oliver Lodge Primary School in Vanderbijlpark, South Africa
The Principality of Hutt River
The Raj of Sarawak.
St Andrews, Fife
The State of South Carolina

As an inscription
on the wall of Edzell Castle, and spelled out by the shrubs in the castle's walled garden
on medallions marking the Barbary Coast Trail in San Francisco, California
on a stained glass window of Beverly Unitarian Church in Chicago

As a title
Japanese avant-garde metal band Dir en Grey named their eighth full-length album Dum Spiro Spero.

Family and individual use
Dum spiro spero is used as a motto by armigerous families including the Corbet baronets of Moreton Corbet (both creations), the Hoare baronets of Annabella, Co. Cork, and the Viscounts Dillon.
The Williamson Clan from Co Donegal, Ireland; and the Scottish Clan MacLennan.
Individuals who used the motto include Charles I, King of England; Sir James Brooke, Rajah of Sarawak, and the merchant seaman and privateer, later Royal Governor of the Bahama Islands, Woodes Rogers.

See also
 List of Latin phrases

References

External links

Latin mottos
State mottos of the United States

de:Liste lateinischer Phrasen/D#Dum